The Hart of London is a 1970 experimental Canadian film directed by Jack Chambers. Stan Brakhage proclaimed it as "one of the greatest films ever made". The film is shown in black and white and colour, and includes found news footage from 1954, film shot by the artist years earlier in Spain, and film shot by the artist in London, Ontario.

The film is preoccupied with the tensions between nature and the city of London: "It explores life and death, the sense of place and personal displacement, and the intricate aesthetics of representation. It is a personal and spiritual film, marked inevitably by Chambers' knowledge that he had leukemia.

References

Bibliography
 Brakhage, Stan. "The Hart of London: A Document of the City." The Films of Jack Chambers. Kathryn Elder, ed. Toronto: Cinematheque Ontario Monographs. 117-124. 
 Camper, Fred. "The Hart of London: Jack Chambers' Absolute Film." The Films of Jack Chambers. Kathryn Elder, ed. Toronto: Cinematheque Ontario Monographs. 133-140. 
 Cheetham, Mark. Jack Chambers: Life & Work. Toronto: Art Canada Institute, 2013. E-Book.
 Elder, R. Bruce. "Forms of Cinema, Models of Self: Jack Chambers' The Hart of London." Take Two. Seth Feldman, ed. Toronto: Irwin Publishing, 1984. 264–274. 
 Elder, R. Bruce. Image and Identity: Reflections on Canadian Film and Culture. Waterloo: Wilfrid Laurier Press, 1989. Chapter 14 § 3, 379–389. .
 Elder, R. Bruce. "Jack Chambers' Surrealism." The Films of Jack Chambers. Kathryn Elder, ed. Toronto: Cinematheque Ontario Monographs. 87-115. . 
 Lang, Avis. "The Hart of London: A Film by Jack Chambers." The Films of Jack Chambers. Kathryn Elder, ed. Toronto: Cinematheque Ontario Monographs. 125–132. 
 Testa, Bart.  "Chambers' Epic: The Hart of London, History's Protagonist." The Films of Jack Chambers. Kathryn Elder, ed. Toronto: Cinematheque Ontario Monographs. 141–174. 
 Tscherkassky, Peter. "At the Heart of London: Jack Chambers' The Hart of London." The Films of Jack Chambers. Kathryn Elder, ed. Toronto: Cinematheque Ontario Monographs. 175–180.

Further reading
 Cheetham, Mark. Jack Chambers: Life & Work. Toronto: Art Canada Institute, 2013. E-Book.
 Elder, Kathryn, ed. The Films of Jack Chambers Toronto: Cinematheque Ontario Monographs.

External links
 
 Jack Chambers: Life & Work by Mark Cheetham, free e-book
 The Canadian Encyclopedia entry on Jack Chambers
 "The Hart of London, a film by Jack Chambers", Fred Camper
 "Jack Chambers: The Hart of London", Art Gallery of Ontario
 Podcast of The Hart of London

1970 films
1970s avant-garde and experimental films
Canadian avant-garde and experimental films
1970s Canadian films